Statistics of Swedish football Division 2 in season 1977.

League standings

Norra

Södra

Footnotes

References
Sweden - List of final tables (Clas Glenning)

1977
2
Sweden
Sweden